Sidney Devereux Little OBE ( – 27 July 2017) was an English rugby union and professional rugby league footballer who played in the 1950s. Little is an Oldham Hall Of Fame Inductee.

Background
Little was born in Kirkbride, Cumberland, and grew up in the nearby village Burgh by Sands.

Playing career

Oldham
About Little's time, there was Oldham's 2-12 defeat by Barrow in the 1954 Lancashire Cup Final during the 1954–55 season at Station Road, Swinton on Saturday 23 October 1954, the 10-3 victory over St. Helens in the 1956 Lancashire Cup Final during the 1956–57 season at Station Road, Swinton on Saturday 20 October 1956, and the 12-2 victory over St. Helens in the 1958 Lancashire Cup Final during the 1958–59 season at Station Road, Swinton on Saturday 25 October 1958, he played right-, i.e. number 12, in Oldham's 13-8 victory over Wigan in the 1957 Lancashire Cup Final during the 1957–58 season at Station Road, Swinton on Saturday 19 October 1957.

Little retired towards the end of the 1958–59 season. In 2005, Little was among the nine players inducted into Oldham's Hall of Fame.

Representative career
In rugby union, Little won caps for Cumberland (RU) while at Harlequin F.C.

In rugby league, Little won 10 caps for Great Britain while at Oldham between 1956 and 1958. He made his début against Australia on 15 December 1956, scoring one try in a 19–0 victory over the Kangaroos. He played in all three matches for Great Britain at the 1957 Rugby League World Cup. He also won caps at county level for Cumberland.

Military career
Little joined the RAF in 1970, and was appointed an OBE for services to the Air Training Corps in the 1982 New Year Honours list.

References

External links
!Great Britain Statistics at englandrl.co.uk (statistics currently missing due to not having appeared for both Great Britain, and England)
(archived by web.archive.org) Statistics at orl-heritagetrust.org.uk
Photograph "Another Championship Final at Odsal - Denis Ayres of Oldham goes over in this Championship Final of 1957. Oldham won the game, beating Hull 15-14. - Date: 01/01/1957" at rlhp.co.uk

1930 births
2017 deaths
Cumberland rugby league team players
English rugby league players
English rugby union players
Great Britain national rugby league team players
Harlequin F.C. players
Officers of the Order of the British Empire
Oldham R.L.F.C. players
People from Burgh by Sands
Rugby league players from Cumbria
Rugby union players from Cumbria
Rugby league players from Wigton
Rugby league props
Rugby league second-rows
Rugby union players from Wigton
Rugby union props